Municipal Silca is a Honduran football club, based in Silca, Honduras.

History
They were relegated to Liga Mayor for the 2008/2009 season.

Achievements
Liga de Ascenso
Runners-up (1): 2008–09 A

References

Football clubs in Honduras